Marcia Furnilla was a Roman noblewoman who lived in the 1st century. Furnilla was the second and last wife of the future Roman Emperor Titus as well as the aunt of the future emperor Trajan.

Family
Marcia Furnilla came from a noble and distinguished family. She was from the gens Marcia who were of plebeian status, claiming descent from the Roman king Ancus Marcius. She was a daughter of Roman Senator Quintus Marcius Barea Sura and Antonia Furnilla. Her sister was Marcia, the mother of Ulpia Marciana and of future Roman Emperor Trajan. Her father was a friend to future Roman Emperor Vespasian (who was Titus' father) and her paternal uncle was the senator Quintus Marcius Barea Soranus, while her paternal cousin was the noblewoman Marcia Servilia Sorana. Furnilla's paternal grandfather was Quintus Marcius Barea Soranus, who was Suffect consul in 34 and Proconsul of the Africa Province in 41–43, while her maternal grandfather could have been Aulus Antonius Rufus, a Suffect consul in 45.

Life
Marcia Furnilla was born and raised in Rome. She married Titus, widowed from his first marriage, in 63. The marriage between Titus and Furnilla was an arranged one.

This marriage for Titus was an influential one and promoted his political career. Suetonius describes Furnilla as a "very well-connected" woman. Furnilla bore Titus a daughter named Flavia, previously assumed to have been Julia Flavia, but it is now regarded that Julia's mother was Titus first wife Arrecina Tertulla. Furnilla's daughter likely died young.

Like Titus' first marriage, this one was short. Furnilla's family was connected to the opponents of Roman Emperor Nero and after the failure of the Pisonian conspiracy in 65, they were disfavored by the Emperor. Titus didn't want to be connected with any potential plotters and ended his marriage to Furnilla, but continued raising their daughter. 

The fate of Furnilla afterwards is unknown. After her death, she was placed along with her mother in the mausoleum of Gaius Sulpicius Platorinus - a magistrate at the time of the first Roman Emperor Augustus - and his sister Sulpicia Platorina in Rome.

References

External links

 Statue of Marcia Furnilla, see section 6. Flavian Women, statue J.
Jstor.org
Roman-emperors.org
Dcodriscoll.pbworks.com
Livius.org
Livius.org
Roman-empire.net
Ancientlibrary.com
Webcitations.org
Penelope.uchicago.edu

1st-century Roman women
Flavian dynasty
Marcii
Titus
Wives of Roman emperors